Choreutis piepersiana is a moth in the family Choreutidae. It was described by Snellen in 1885. It is found on Sulawesi.

References

Natural History Museum Lepidoptera generic names catalog

Choreutis
Moths described in 1885